The Varagno is a stream in the department of Haute-Corse, Corsica, France.
It is a tributary of the Fiumorbo.

Course

The stream, known in its upper section as the Ruisseau d'Albarelli, rises to the east of the  Punta di Taoria.
It flows southeast and then east past the village of Ajola, and continues east to its junction with the Fiumorbo to the northeast of the town of Ghisonaccia.
It is crossed by the D44 near Ajola and by the D244 further down, but no roads follow its course.

Environment

The Varagno flows through the Forêts du Fiumorbu, designated as a Zone naturelle d'intérêt écologique, faunistique et floristique (ZNIEFF).
This includes the upper and middle watershed of the Abatesco and tributaries of the Fium'Orbu river such as the Saltaruccio and Varagno streams. 
The higher parts of the area are mainly covered with beech forest (Fagus sylvatica), birch groves, fir forests and laricio pines (Pinus nigra laricio). 
Lower down there are stands of maritime pines (Pinus pinaster) and holm oaks (Quercus ilex).

Hydrology

The Varagno was observed at the Pont de Coty, where it is crossed by the D244, between May and September from 2012 to 2021.
There was low visible flow in August 2012, 2013 and 2015, and in September 2015.

Tributaries

The following streams (ruisseaux) are tributaries of the Varagno (ordered by length) and sub-tributaries:

 Agnone: 
 Debbione: 
 Carpinetti: 
 Chizzo: 
 Nursoli: 
 Argentuccio: 
 Pincioni: 
 Giovanni: 
 Stazzale: 
 Alzone: 
 Conca: 
 Pettinelli: 
 Biciancola: 
 Monte: 
 Suartello: 
 Ajola: 
 Latelli:

Notes

Sources

Rivers of Haute-Corse
Rivers of France